is a former Team BII member of the Japanese idol girl group NMB48. She was born in Osaka Prefecture and is currently based in New York.

Biography 

Yabushita passed NMB48's 3rd generation auditions in December 2011. Her debut was on February 29, 2012. Her stage debut was on April 29, 2012. On October 10, 2012, she was selected to form Team BII.

Yabushita's first NMB48 Senbatsu was for the single Virginity.

In the 2013 general elections, Yabushita ranked for the first time, placing 49th with 14,745 votes. In 2014, she placed 59th with 14,119 votes.

On December 9, 2016, Yabushita announced her graduation.

On April 19, 2017, Yabushita graduated from the group's Team N. A month earlier, her sister  joined the idol group STU48.

On June 29, 2018, Yabushita announced that she has moved to New York City.

Discography

NMB48 singles

AKB48 singles

Appearances

Stage Units
NMB48 Kenkyuusei Stage "Aitakatta"
 "Nageki no Figure"
 "Glass no I LOVE YOU"
 "Senaka Kara Dakishimete"
 "Rio no Kakumei"

NMB48 BII 1st Stage "Aitakatta"
 "Nageki no Figure"
 "Nagisa no CHERRY"
 "Senaka Kara Dakishimete"
 "Rio no Kakumei"

Team BII 2nd Stage "Tadaima Renaichuu"
 "7ji 12fun no Hatsukoi"

Team BII 3rd Stage "Tadaima Renaichuu"
 "Wagamama na Nagareboshi"

Variety Shows
 NMB48 Geinin! (2012)
 NMB48 Geinin!! 2 (2013)

TV Dramas
AKB Horror Night: Adrenaline's Night Ep.32 - Face Authentication, as Risa (2016)

External links
 NMB48 Official Profile
 Official Blog
 Shu Yabushita on Google+

References

1998 births
Living people
Japanese idols
Japanese women pop singers
People from Osaka Prefecture
Musicians from Osaka Prefecture
NMB48 members
Japanese expatriates in the United States